The Lugubrious Game (or The Mournful Game) is a part oil painting and part collage-on-cardboard work created by Salvador Dalí in 1929. The name of the painting was given by poet Paul Éluard.

History 
In 1929, several Surrealists including Paul Éluard and his wife Gala were visiting Dalí at his home in Spain. Upon seeing the Surrealist style painting, they were intrigued by it, which led to Dalí becoming an official member of the movement. 

The painting was the subject of an analysis by Georges Bataille for Documents issue no. 7.

References

Paintings by Salvador Dalí
Surrealist paintings
1929 paintings